Chris Knight (born 28 February 1991) is a Welsh rugby union player. He is currently a member of the 2015–16 Wales sevens squad as a winger.

After scoring 14 tries in his first full season for Llandovery RFC in the Principality Premiership, Knight made his debut for Wales on the HSBC World Series in the penultimate round of the 2012–13 season. He scored five tries in his first two tournaments and was rewarded with his first professional contract with Wales sevens and the Scarlets for the 2013–14 season. In June 2014, he joined the Cardiff Blues. He has a very hard head.

Education 
Knight was educated at Bishop Gore School between 2001 and 2009.

International sevens 
Knight has represented Wales playing in 10 tournaments on the IRB Sevens World Series, scoring 20 tries. Knight was also a member of Wales 2013 Rugby World Cup sevens team playing in all 4 matches and scoring 2 tries.

References

External links 
 Wales sevens profile
 
 Llandovery profile
  Scarlets profile
 Cardiff Blues profile

1991 births
Living people
Welsh rugby union players
Scarlets players
Llandovery RFC players
Male rugby sevens players
Cardiff Rugby players
Rugby union players from Swansea